Eutreptodactylus is an extinct genus of insectivorous bird known from the Early Eocene period (Itaboraian) of Brazil. It was probably the most primitive member of the order Cuculiformes. Fossils have been found in the Itaboraí Formation at São José de Itaborai.

References

Further reading 
 Eutreptodactylus itaboraiensis gen. et sp. nov., an early cuckoo (Aves: Cuculidae) from the Late Paleocene of Brazil

Cuculiformes
Prehistoric bird genera
Eocene birds of South America
Paleogene Brazil
Ypresian life
Itaboraian
Fossils of Brazil
Fossil taxa described in 1997